Lateral cutaneous nerve of arm may refer to:

 Inferior lateral cutaneous nerve of arm
 Superior lateral cutaneous nerve of arm